Sin Sovannmakara (born 6 December 2004) is a Cambodian footballer currently playing as a midfielder for Visakha  in the Cambodian Second League, and the Cambodia national team. He is younger brother of Sin Kakada who is currently playing for Visakha.

References

External links
 

2004 births
Living people
Cambodian footballers
Cambodia international footballers
People from Kandal province
Association football midfielders
Competitors at the 2021 Southeast Asian Games
Southeast Asian Games competitors for Cambodia